The flag of Western Province, was adopted for the Western Province of Sri Lanka in 1987.

Symbolism
The flag of the Western Province has concentric rectangles. The outer rectangle is green with the next one being white. It has decorative green and yellow leaves and in the corners are four arrows separating each side. In the dark red central rectangle, there are four Bo leaves in the corners and three white rings in the middle. Within the first is a three headed golden snake; in the central one is a golden lion with sword; and in the last one is a golden bird or cock with a sword.

See also
 Flag of Sri Lanka
 List of Sri Lankan flags

References

External links
 Flag of Western Province
 Western Province Provincial Council
 Flagspot
 Sri Lanka.Asia

Western Province
Western Province
Western Province, Sri Lanka
Western Province
Flags displaying animals